Quinic acid is a cyclitol, a cyclic polyol, and a cyclohexanecarboxylic acid. It is a colorless solid that can be extracted from plant sources. Quinic acid is implicated in the perceived acidity of coffee.

Occurrence and preparation
The compound is obtained from cinchona bark, coffee beans, and the bark of Eucalyptus globulus.   It is a constituent of the tara tannins.

Urtica dioica is another common source.

It is made synthetically by hydrolysis of chlorogenic acid. Quinic acid is also implicated in the perceived acidity of coffee.

History and biosynthesis 
This substance was isolated for the first time in 1790 by German pharmacist Friedrich Christian Hofmann in Leer from Cinchona. Its transformation into hippuric acid by animal metabolism was studied by German chemist Eduard Lautemann in 1863.

Its biosynthesis begins with the transformation of glucose into erythrose 4-phosphate. This four-carbon substrate is condensed with phosphoenol pyruvate to give the seven-carbon 3-deoxy-D-arabinoheptulosonate 7-phosphate (DAHP) by the action of a synthase. Two subsequent steps involving dehydroquinic acid synthase and a dehydrogenase afford the compound.

Derived bicyclic lactones are called quinides. One example is 4-caffeoyl-1,5-quinide.

Dehydrogenation and oxidation of quinic acid affords gallic acid.

Applications and medicinal activity
Quinic acid is used as an astringent.

This acid is a versatile chiral starting material for the synthesis of pharmaceuticals. It is a building block in the synthesis of Oseltamivir, which is used to treat influenza A and B.

References

Further reading

 
Cyclohexanecarboxylic acids
Tetrols